Robstown is a city in Nueces County, Texas, United States, and a western suburb of Corpus Christi. It was founded about 1906, and was named for Robert Driscoll. The population was 11,487 as of the 2010 census.

The Texas State Legislature officially recognizes Robstown as the birthplace of Texas hold 'em poker.

Geography

Robstown is located at  (27.792615, –97.669386).

Climate

The climate in Robstown is characterized by hot, humid summers and generally mild to cool winters.  According to the Köppen climate classification system, Robstown has a humid subtropical climate, Cfa on climate maps.

Demographics

2020 census

As of the 2020 United States census, there were 10,143 people, 4,137 households, and 2,731 families residing in the city.

2019
As of 2019, the Census Bureau estimates the population to be 11,261 people and consisting of 3,728 households. Owner-occupied housing is 58.1%. The average household has 3.06 persons. The racial makeup of the city was 5.6% White, 0.2% Native American, 0.1% Asian, and 0.9% from two or more races. Hispanics or Latinos of any race were 93.8% of the population. Non-Hispanic Whites were 5.8% of the population. Median value of housing was $52,900. Median gross rent was $688 per month.

In the city, the age distribution of the population was 9.2% under the age of 5, 31.0% under the age of 18, and 17.1% who were 65  or older. Females were 51.1% of the population. Foreign-born persons were 5.3% of the population.

Population density was 741.0 persons/sq mi. Land area is 15.50 sq mi. The FIPS code is 4862600

The median income for a household in the city was $29,218. Per capita income was $14,178. The poverty rate was 41.1%.

Point of interest
The Robstown post office contains a mural, Founding and Subsequent Development of Robstown, Texas, painted in 1941 by Alice Reynolds.  Federally commissioned murals were produced from 1934 to 1943 in the United States through the Section of Painting and Sculpture, later called the Section of Fine Arts, of the Treasury Department.

Neighborhoods

Robstown is divided into several distinct neighborhoods. The Ashburn, Kissling area is located just east of Bluebonnet, next to the Robstown Early College High School. The area locally known as Bluebonnet is located in the northwest area of town, right next to Robstown Early College High School. The area locally known as Casa Blanca has a school. San Pedro is on the westside, next to San Pedro Elementary School.

Education
The City of Robstown is served by the Robstown Independent School District. The Robstown Early College High School's early college program is also assisted by Del Mar College, Coastal Bend College, and the University of Texas.

Notable people

 Damian Chapa, starred in the famous Mexican American film Blood In, Blood Out
 Eddie Jackson, is the bassist for Seattle progressive metal band Queensrÿche
 Brooks Kieschnick, a former MLB player for the Chicago Cubs, Cincinnati Reds, Colorado Rockies, and Milwaukee Brewers, was inducted into the College Baseball Hall of Fame
 Solomon P. Ortiz, former U.S. Representative for 
 Gene Upshaw, a former NFL player for the Oakland Raiders, was inducted into the Pro Football Hall of Fame
 Marvin Upshaw, was a player for the Cleveland Browns, Kansas City Chiefs, and  St. Louis Cardinals

References

External links
 

 

Cities in Nueces County, Texas
Cities in Texas
Cities in the Corpus Christi metropolitan area